Zyaylevo (Yäyläw) is a rural locality (a village) in Isametovsky Selsoviet, Ilishevsky District, Bashkortostan, Russia. The population was 181 as of 2010. There are 2 streets.

Geography 
Zyaylevo is located 5 km north of Verkhneyarkeyevo (the district's administrative centre) by road.

References 

Rural localities in Ilishevsky District